World of Warcraft, or WoW, is set in a fictional universe, its primary setting being the planet of Azeroth. The first expansion, The Burning Crusade, introduced a second planet, Outland. Wrath of the Lich King and Cataclysm expanded upon Azeroth and respectively added Northrend, the frigid northern continent of Azeroth, and drastically changed various other continents by destroying some and unveiling new ones. The next expansion, Mists of Pandaria, added Pandaria, the southern continent previously hidden behind a perennial mist cover. Warlords of Draenor introduced the planet of Draenor, a version of Outland in a different timeline before its partial destruction. The Legion expansion took adventurers to the Broken Isles, an island chain near the Maelstrom in the middle of the Great Sea, and the damaged planet Argus, the headquarters of the Burning Legion. The seventh expansion, Battle for Azeroth, added two new island continents to the center of Azeroth: Kul Tiras and Zandalar. The latest expansion, Shadowlands, introduced the eponymous Shadowlands, a realm composed of five major zones: Bastion, Maldraxxus, Ardenweald, Revendreth, and the Maw.

In the game, players design a playable character based on a number of starting options, such as the race of a character and its class. Gameplay primarily consists of completing quests, dungeons and raids, and other in-game activities to obtain rewards which allows one to improve one's character and equipment in order to be able to complete the more difficult quests, dungeons, and raids. Players can also participate in player versus player combat, either in large groups, small team matches, or individual skirmishes.

Over time, a number of additional features and improvements have been added to the game world, such as additional locations to explore, and seasonal and periodic events such as Hallow's End, the Midsummer Fire Festival, and weekly fishing competitions in the Cape of Stranglethorn zone. Among the newer features added is a pet battle system akin to Pokémon, where players can collect pets all over the game world and battle with them and garrisons, which is a player-controlled area where players recruit non-player characters (NPC) to carry out quests to earn players or the NPCs items. Players can also modify their in-game experience through the use of third-party modifications such as macros and add-ons. Any software that can modify game mechanics (such as Glider) is against the terms of use.

Characters

To start, players select a game realm or server to play on. Each realm is in one of four different categories, depending on which set of combat rules it uses. These can be either where players are mainly focused on defeating monsters and completing quests, and player versus player combat is not permitted unless inside opposing cities, (player versus environment or PVE), or where open combat between players is permitted (player versus player or PvP). There are also dedicated roleplay (or RP) versions of both these types, where players are encouraged to control their character as if they were an inhabitant of a fantasy world. Realms are also categorised by the language players are encouraged to use, offering in-game support in that language. Players are able to transfer their established characters between realms in the same territory (North America, Europe, etc.) for a fee. As of patch 8.1.5, a player may create a maximum number of fifty characters per account on any realm.

Once a player has selected a realm, an option to create a character is available. A player can select one of two opposing factions to place their character in: the Horde or the Alliance. Characters can only communicate and group with other characters of the same faction. Each faction has seven (including the Pandaren, that are neutral at the beginning) races to choose from. Race determines the character's appearance, starting location, and initial skill set, called "racial traits". The Alliance currently consists of humans, night elves, dwarves, gnomes, draenei and worgen; the Horde currently consists of orcs, tauren, Forsaken, trolls, blood elves and goblins. The draenei and blood elves were added as part of the Burning Crusade expansion. Worgen and goblins were added for the Alliance and Horde respectively in the following expansion pack, Cataclysm. In Mists of Pandaria, the pandaren were added as World of Warcraft's first ever "neutral" race. At the conclusion of the beginner zone quests for pandaren (around level 12), the player must choose to permanently join either the Alliance or the Horde. As of Battle for Azeroth there are ten additional allied races for players to use, which are generally variants of existing races with unique racials and themes. Further options to customize the appearance, such as hairstyles, skin tones, etc. are also available. Once set, the face and skin tone are not able to be changed; however the hair style, color, and other decorations, such as earrings and facial hair, can be changed by visiting barbershops within capital cities. The entire appearance of a character (including face, skin tone, gender) can be changed via Blizzard's paid character re-customization service - however, this changed in the Shadowlands expansion which completely removed the paid re-costumization service and incorporates it into the barbershops for free.

Depending on the race chosen and the expansions installed, a player then has five to eight of the game's thirteen character classes to choose from. The mechanics of each class vary, with some geared towards melee combat, while others are more suited to attacking from range or casting spells. The game has three roles, DPS (damage dealer), tank and healer; a member of any class can be customized for the DPS role, while members of some classes, known as hybrids, can also be customized as healers, tanks or any of the three roles. Currently available classes are: druids, death knight, demon hunters, hunters, mages, monks, paladins, priests, rogues, shamans, warlocks and warriors. Originally, paladins were available only to Alliance races and shamans were only available to Horde races, but both classes were made available to both sides in The Burning Crusade. The death knight, introduced in Wrath of the Lich King, is a hero class, with the characters beginning at level 55 (roughly mid-way to a maximum level), already equipped with powerful gear. Creation of a death knight required the player to already have at least one level 55 character on their account, since Legion this is no longer the case. The demon hunter, introduced in Legion, is another hero class that requires the player to have a level 70 character. Once a player has one, the player is permitted to create a demon hunter that starts at level 98.

While a character can be played on its own, players can also group up with others in order to tackle more challenging content. In this way, character classes are used in specific roles within a group. Players are also able to customize their character through the use of talents, which are further abilities related to their character class.

Characters are also able to learn two primary professions from ten options. These can be gathering professions, such as mining, herbalism or animal skinning. Characters can also choose from gear crafting professions, such as blacksmithing or leatherworking, or item enhancement professions such as enchanting or jewelcrafting. Professions are not directly linked to a character's class (e.g., warriors can be alchemists, mages can be skinners, etc.). However, some skills available to certain classes (e.g., the ability to track animals) are useful to certain professions. Characters can also learn all secondary professions: cooking, fishing, first aid and archaeology. In the Burning Crusade expansion, additional profession specialisations were added, allowing a character to gain new restricted techniques such as an alchemist mastering potions, elixirs, or transmutations. In the Cataclysm expansion, the secondary profession of archaeology was added which allows players to dig up and recover artifacts from all over the game.

As well as banding together to form groups, players can also band together to form a guild. These organizations allow players several benefits, such as easier communication through a shared chat channel and an identifying guild name and tabard. Guild members can also be given access to a central pool of resources known as a guild bank. Guilds can also make use of an in-game calendar, allowing guild members to view scheduled events, and respond to them with whether they can attend or not. This calendar can also be accessed without need to log into the game, using the Armory feature. Guild members that accomplish goals together gain guild experience and advance the level of their guild, granting guild members various benefits.

Setting

In a change from the previous Warcraft games produced by Blizzard, World of Warcraft is a massively multiplayer online role-playing game (MMORPG) where thousands of players can interact with each other. Despite this change, the game draws many similarities with its predecessors. These include using the same setting of the world of Azeroth as well as following a similar art direction. In common with many MMORPGs, World of Warcraft requires players to pay for a subscription, usually either by credit card or by buying a card from a retailer to redeem for a predetermined amount of subscription time; in addition, game time may be acquired from using in-game gold to buy a WoW Token.

World of Warcraft takes place in a 3D-representation of the Warcraft universe that players can interact with through their characters. The game features five continents on the world of Azeroth, as well as the realm of Outland that was added in the expansion The Burning Crusade. Warlords Of Draenor introduced the realm of Draenor, an altered past of Outland. The second expansion, Wrath of the Lich King, added a third continent, Northrend . to Azeroth, and in Mists of Pandaria a fourth continent, Pandaria, was added. In Legion, they introduce the Broken Isles. With the Battle for Azeroth expansion came 2 new continents, Kul Tiras (mainly for Alliance) and Zandalar (mainly for the Horde). In this game world, players use their characters to explore locations, defeat creatures and complete quests. By doing this, characters gain experience points. After a set number of experience points have been gained, a character gains a level, giving new skills or abilities and making it possible to explore new areas and attempt new quests. As a player explores new locations, a number of transport shortcuts become available. Players can discover 'flight masters' in newly discovered locations and then use those NPCs in order to fly to previously discovered locations in other parts of the world. Players can also use facilities such as boats and zeppelins in order to move from one of the continents on Azeroth to the other. Players can communicate with each other using text-based chat, separated into different channels for ease of use. When a player instructs their character to yell or say something, a chat bubble appears above their head containing the spoken words in a similar way to a comic book image.

A number of facilities are available to characters when in towns and cities. In each major city, characters can access a bank in order to deposit items, such as treasure or crafted items. Each bank is unique to that character, with players able to purchase additional storage space through in-game currency. An addition in the Burning Crusade expansion was the concept of guild banks, allowing members of the same guild to contribute items, resources and in-game currency to a central pool. In the major cities of Azeroth, 'Auction Houses' also exist as a way for characters to sell items to others in a similar way to online auction sites such as eBay. Finally, in almost every town and in every major city are mailboxes. A mailbox can be used to collect items won at auction and also to send messages, items or in-game gold to other characters. A unique feature of this is the ability to send items requiring "cash on delivery", where the receiving character has to pay to accept the item, allowing for sale of items outside of the auction house.

Although the game world remains reasonably similar from day to day, changes have been made over time. Seasonal events that reflect on real world events such as Oktoberfest (as Brewfest), Halloween (as Hallow's End), Christmas (as Winter Veil), Children's Week, Easter (as Noblegarden) and Midsummer run for a period of a day or two up to several weeks. More regular events such as a fishing tournament have also been set up for players to take part in. Other changes include adding weather effects such as rain, snow and dust storms to areas, or redeveloping areas of the game in order to add new quests or to continue a particular storyline in the game. This can also include adding new dungeons to locations for the players to explore.

Questing
A large amount of World of Warcraft revolves around questing. These tasks or missions are usually available from non-player characters (NPCs). Quests usually reward the player with experience points and in-game money that the character can then spend on buying new skills and equipment. Some quests offer a selection of quest rewards, allowing the player to choose what would suit his or her character best. It is also through the use of quests that much of the game's story is told, with NPCs sometimes performing a small routine once a quest is handed in. Sometimes, quests of this nature are linked together by a common theme. Where one quest ends, another starts, forming a quest chain. A unique aspect of World of Warcraft is the use of a "rested bonus" system, increasing the rate that a character can gain experience points after the player has spent time away from the game.

Quests commonly involve killing a number of creatures, gathering a certain number of resources, finding a difficult to locate object, or delivering an item from one place to another. During this process, a character may get attacked and killed by a creature, becoming a ghost at a nearby graveyard. Characters can be resurrected by other characters that have the ability, or can self-resurrect by moving from the graveyard to the place where they died. If this location is unreachable, they can use a special NPC known as a spirit healer to resurrect at the graveyard, although Blizzard has had the foresight to automatically resurrect characters in some such cases. When a character dies the items being carried degrade, requiring in-game money and a specialist NPC to repair them. Items that degrade heavily can become unusable until they are repaired.

As well as gaining in-game money, items and experience points, many quests will also increase reputation with a faction. This may be one of the two main factions of Alliance or Horde or another non-allied faction. It can also be possible for a player to improve their character's reputation with a faction by completing further quests or killing certain types of creatures. Enhancing a character's reputation can gain access to rare items, unique abilities and profession-based patterns and plans, as well as lowering cost of items sold by NPCs belonging to that faction (such as superior gear items or special mounts).

Quest are divided into several categories and all offer a reward in itself:

 Killing quests: the most common quest type. Involves killing a certain number or enemies, beasts or both.
 Gathering quests: the second most common type. Involves collecting resources (or a combination of) to be processed and/or delivered to the recipient NPC.
 Wanted quests: A quest requiring you to kill a more elite or rare enemy or a combination of them. They offer additional rewards due to their more challenging nature.
 Announcement quests: given on information boards in the larger or capital cities. Usually, these require the player to travel to new regions and start the quest chains there.
 Exploration quests: quests that require the player to, as the name suggests, scout or explore a region or area, or mark a territory.
 Daily/weekly quests: quests that are repeatable on a daily or weekly basis. These usually involve quests intended to earn reputation with the specific faction(s).
 Rescue quests: a less common quest, usually happens when doing other quests in the area. As the name suggests, the player is required to safely guide an NPC out of the area.
 Loot quests: quests that are linked to certain items. Usually, these are linked to an item dropped in an instance or zone and grants a reward. The player can only do these once per character.
 Invitation quests: similar loot quests, the player receives the quest from a looted item and it serves as a means of introduction into a faction or specific in-game events, such as the Brawlers' Guild or specific reward quests.

Quests are identified by either a ! (meaning a quest is available) or a ? (meaning a quest can be completed with that particular NPC). 
The color indicates whether it is a low-level (dark yellow), on-level (bright yellow), challenging (reddish yellow) or not doable yet (red). Daily or weekly quests are blue.

Dungeons
Some of the harder challenges in World of Warcraft require players to group together to defeat them. These usually take place in dungeons or in separate zones, also known as instances, that a group of characters can enter together. The term comes from each group or party having a separate copy or instance of the dungeon, complete with their own enemies to defeat and their own treasure or rewards. This allows players to explore areas and defeat quests without other players outside the group interfering. Dungeons are spread over the game world and are designed for characters of varying progression. A "looking for group" option allows players to passively find other players interested in doing the same instance.

A typical dungeon will allow up to five characters to enter as part of a group. High end dungeons allow more players to group together and form a raid. These dungeons allow up to forty players to enter at a time in order to face some of the most difficult challenges. In the Burning Crusade and later expansions the most common group sizes are ten and twenty-five, based on the idea that these groups would be easier to fill and coordinate. As well as dungeon-based raid challenges, several creatures exist in the normal game environment that are designed for raids to attack.
As of Mists of Pandaria (MoP), there are the dungeons, scenarios, raids, battlegrounds and arenas that fall under this category.

- Dungeons exist as 'normal' and, in some cases, also come in a 'Heroic' or 'HC' version. While the mechanics in both versions are the same, the rewards and difficulty are different. In Warlords of Draenor (WoD), Mythic versions of dungeons were added that increase the rewards and difficulty more than in heroic. 
 
- Scenarios are short, three-player instances, that involve a specific sequence of events that have to be completed. Unlike dungeons, the party members do not need to be of a specific type. In the later patches of MoP, Heroic versions were added that require the players to assemble their own team and walk to the portal in order to access them.

- Raids are the larger instances and usually involve a specific end of the expansion or final target. There can be more than one raid as several final targets may exist. 
Players can raid in teams of 10 or 25 ("normal" or "heroic" mode) that are assembled manually, 25 for the "looking for raid" raids, as added per MoP patch 5.4 "Siege of Orgrimmar", players in normal or heroic mode can play in 'flexible' raids, allowing teams of minimum 10 and maximum 25, which was later increased to 30 in WoD. These raids become more difficult with each added player above 10. Also in patch 5.4, a Mythic version of the current raid was added that increases the rewards and difficulty more than in heroic and requires a 20 player raid made of players all on the same realm. All WoD and Legion raids include a Mythic version.

- Battlegrounds (BG) and rated BGs are small zoned instances that require players to engage a team of an equal number of the opposing faction in order to secure territory within the zone (à la "capture the flag), score resources or simply outwit the opposing team. Requires PvP to be enabled.

- Arenas are small areas that require players to have PvP enabled and consist of pre-assembled teams of 2, 3 or 5 players.

- Brawler's Guild is a permanent PvE version of an arena and allows players to hone their skills without requiring PvP or score ranking. They are challenging and each NPC opponent has his or her specific tactics in order of defeating an opponent or opponents.

- Proving Grounds are single player scenarios that test a player's ability in either the damage, tanking or healing role. These scenarios have levels, either in Bronze, Silver, Gold or Endless mode, with each difficulty unlocked by defeating the previous one. In Warlords, a silver medal from the proving grounds is required for the desired role in order to queue for random matchmaking for a heroic dungeon.

Player versus player
Players may choose to fight against others in player versus player combat. World of Warcraft contains a variety of mechanisms for this. First, some servers (labeled PvP) allow player versus player combat to take place almost anywhere in the game world outside of areas for new players. In these environments, members of opposing factions can attack each other at any time. In contrast, player versus environment (PvE) servers allow a player to choose to engage in combat against other players. On both server types, there are special areas of the world where free-for-all combat is permitted.

World of Warcraft also makes use of battlegrounds. These locations act in a similar way to dungeons or instances in that only a set number of characters can enter a single battleground, but additional copies of the battleground can be made to accommodate additional players. Each battleground has a set objective, such as capturing a flag or defeating an opposing general, that must be completed in order to win the battleground. Victory rewards the character with Honor Points that can be used to buy armor and weapons. Initially a ladder-based system was implemented, where the Honor Points accumulated in a week would affect that character's standing in the ladder, allowing them to purchase more powerful weapons and armor. This was changed following the release of the Burning Crusade expansion so that equipment became available to all, with Honor Points being used to exchange for pieces of equipment. In Legion instead of Honor Points for gear the player is given a box that possibly contains gear and artifact power.

Arenas are a further development for player versus player that were added in the Burning Crusade expansion. In these, a player's character can join a team in order to compete in arena matches. These matches are among a small number of characters (between 2 or 3 per side) in two teams. Participation in arena matches rewards the character with a number of Conquest Points, depending on the result of the match. Successful arena teams can use these points to buy armor and weapons of a higher quality than those available from battlegrounds. Blizzard and other organizations also run a number of arena-based tournaments, where teams can compete against each other for cash prizes.

In the Wrath of the Lich King expansion, a new player versus player zone was introduced called Wintergrasp. For player versus environment realms, this zone differs in that players of the opposing faction are able to attack each other merely by entering the zone which flags them automatically for player versus player combat.

In Legion there were a number of changes to the PvP aspects of the game. There is a PvP honor system that unlocks PvP honor talents and there are separate abilities for use only in PvP that are not available in regular gameplay. Honor talents are abilities earned through increased levels in PvP and are activated while players engage in PvP. Once players hit maximum honor level, they can choose to earn a prestige level that resets the honor talents earned and gives cosmetic bonuses. In PvP combat, gear will be nullified and all bonuses related to gear will be deactivated, with the exception of artifact weapons and their related powers. Instead, the game will predetermine a set of stats configured to a player's specialization that can be modified for class balance purposes. However, a player's average item level will still factor in PvP; every point above item level 800 results in a 0.1% increase to a player's PvP stats.

Miscellaneous features

A number of features have been added to World of Warcraft, either prior to the original release or in one of the following content updates. From early in the game's development, Blizzard has allowed players to customize their game interface through the use of modifications, also known as mods or add-ons. These mods can help the player by automating simple tasks, grouping similar spells or abilities together and enhances the way information about the game environment is presented to the player. Mods are developed using the Lua and XML scripting languages, while images and models use the Targa and BLP image formats. Blizzard provides support to allow players to generate their own mods through the User Interface Customization Tool, although it does not provide support for any third-party mods. Some programs that operate alongside World of Warcraft, typically to automate repetitive tasks and allow the game to be played without input from the player, are against the game's terms of use. Use of these type of programs is considered an exploit and may lead to suspension or closure of a player's account.

References

World of Warcraft
World of Warcraft